Olivia Celia McKoy (born 1 December 1973) is a retired female shot put, weights, hammer, javelin, and discus thrower from Jamaica West Indies. Olivia McKoy also competes in the local 5K, 10K, & 1/2 Marathon Road Races.

She won gold and bronze at the 1992 Carifta Games in Nassau Bahamas.
She won silver medals at the 1999 and 2005 Central American and Caribbean Championships and the bronze medal at the 2006 Commonwealth Games, and finished fourth at the 2006 Central American and Caribbean Games.

She also competed at the 2000 Olympic Games, the 2005 World Championships and the 2008 Olympic Games. Her personal best throw is 61.10 metres, the standing Jamaican Woman's record, achieved in July 2005 in Nassau.

McKoy received All-American status (2nd place finishes) at the 1997 & 1998 NCAA Division 1 Inter-Universities Championships, competing for Louisiana Tech University where she graduated, (Industrial organizational Psychology) cum laude.  She was coached by Larry Carmichael. McKoy is also a graduate of North Caribbean University. (cum laude)

McKoy went on to compete in the long distance races locally { walk races, 5k, 10ks 1/2 marathons} after competing at the 2008 Beijing Olympics. Following a stint coaching high school girl javelin and discus throwers in Georgia, McKoy returned to her hometown of Mandeville. She taught at Hydel High School, St. Mary's College, Bog Walk High,now Enid Bennett High, and Premeire Learning Centre (pre-school) in Georgia, USA, with plans to open her own school.'The Olivia's Athletic & Academic Institute

In March 2015, McKoy competed in the University of the West Indies Track and Field Meet and took first place in the women's javelin with a throw of 49.62 m. This performance has led to considerations of returning To Competitive training. Reopening a senior career for McKoy.

Competition record

References

External links

1973 births
Living people
Jamaican female javelin throwers
Athletes (track and field) at the 2000 Summer Olympics
Athletes (track and field) at the 2008 Summer Olympics
Athletes (track and field) at the 2006 Commonwealth Games
Athletes (track and field) at the 1999 Pan American Games
Athletes (track and field) at the 2011 Pan American Games
Olympic athletes of Jamaica
Louisiana Tech University alumni
People from Saint Catherine Parish
Commonwealth Games medallists in athletics
Commonwealth Games bronze medallists for Jamaica
Pan American Games competitors for Jamaica
Medallists at the 2006 Commonwealth Games